The 2002–03 California Golden Bears men's basketball team represented the University of California, Berkeley during the 2002–03 season.

Led by head coach Ben Braun, the Bears finished the regular season with a 13–5 record in the Pac-10, placing them in third. The Bears would receive an at-large bid into the NCAA tournament where they defeated NC State before falling to Oklahoma in the second round. The team finished the season with an overall record of 22–9.

Roster

Schedule and results

|-
!colspan=9 style=| Regular Season

|-
!colspan=9 style=| Pac-10 Tournament

|-
!colspan=9 style=| NCAA Tournament

Rankings

References

California Golden Bears men's basketball seasons
California
California
California Golden Bear
California Golden Bear